16th Group may refer to:

 16th Carrier Air Group, a formation of the United Kingdom Royal Navy
 16th Military Police Brigade (United States), a unit of the United States Army
 16th Air Expeditionary Wing (16th Bombardment Group), a unit of the United States Air Force
 Chalocgens, 16th group of the Periodic Table

See also
 16th Army (disambiguation)
 16th Wing (disambiguation)
 16th Division (disambiguation)
 16th Brigade (disambiguation)
 16th Regiment (disambiguation)
 16th Squadron (disambiguation)